Aldersladum jengi is a species of the genus Aldersladum.

References 

Aquatic organisms
Animals described in 2011
Alcyoniidae